Ángel Gastón Casas Jorge (born 10 January 1978) is an Argentine football manager and former player who played as a striker. He is the current manager of Huracán's youth setup.

Club career
Born in Buenos Aires, Casas started playing professionally with Club Atlético Huracán, moving in 2000 to Spain with Real Betis and helping the Andalusian team achieve promotion to La Liga in his first season. Due to the years spent in the latter country, he eventually gained dual nationality.

Casas returned to Argentina in 2003, representing Racing Club de Avellaneda and Argentinos Juniors, but made the switch back to Spain two years later, consecutively playing in the country's second division with Recreativo de Huelva, Elche CF, Cádiz CF and Córdoba CF. In the 2005–06 campaign, he finished fifth in the topscorer's chart at 14 as the first club returned to La Liga after a three-year absence.

In February 2009, after his release from Córdoba, Casas moved to Ionikos F.C. in the Greek second division. He scored on his debut, a 4–4 home draw against Olympiakos Volou FC.

On 29 August 2009, Casas moved teams again but stayed in the country, joining Athlitiki Enosi Larissa F.C. on a one-year contract. However, in January 2010, he returned to Argentina, signing with Club de Gimnasia y Esgrima La Plata on loan.

References

External links

1978 births
Living people
Argentine people of Spanish descent
Footballers from Buenos Aires
Argentine footballers
Association football forwards
Argentine Primera División players
Club Atlético Huracán footballers
Racing Club de Avellaneda footballers
Argentinos Juniors footballers
Club de Gimnasia y Esgrima La Plata footballers
Talleres de Remedios de Escalada footballers
La Liga players
Segunda División players
Real Betis players
Recreativo de Huelva players
Elche CF players
Cádiz CF players
Córdoba CF players
Super League Greece players
Football League (Greece) players
Ionikos F.C. players
Athlitiki Enosi Larissa F.C. players
Argentine expatriate footballers
Expatriate footballers in Spain
Expatriate footballers in Greece
Argentine expatriate sportspeople in Spain
Argentine expatriate sportspeople in Greece
Argentine football managers
Club Atlético Huracán managers